Athletes Unlimited Softball is a women's professional softball league in the United States, founded in 2020.

League history
Athletes Unlimited was founded by Jonathan Soros and Jon Patricof. There are no team owners, and league investors are capping their returns. Athletes share in the league profits, and are involved in the daily decision making.

Players are not committed to one team but switch teams every week of the season through a draft. The top four players who earned the most points each week become captains for the next week and form new teams. Players earn points based on both their team and individual performances, and are ranked accordingly. The champion is the player with the most points at the end of the season.

AUX Softball
On December 21, 2021, Athletes Unlimited Softball announced a new two-week competition titled AUX Softball. The competition will provide more playing opportunities and compensation to athletes. The inaugural competition featured 42 athletes playing 18 games and took place June 13-26, 2022, coinciding with the 50th anniversary of Title IX on June 23.

Champions

2020 Season 
The inaugural season was played in Rosemont, Illinois between August 20 and September 28, 2020. Two games were played each Saturday, Sunday, and Monday over the five week period, 30 games all together (15 per player). The top four players were named the medalists and Haylie McCleney was named the Defensive Player of the Year.

See also
Softball in the United States
Athletes Unlimited Volleyball
Athletes Unlimited Basketball

References

Softball competitions in the United States
Sports leagues established in 2020
Professional sports leagues in the United States